Noah Hegge (born 15 March 1999) is a German slalom canoeist who has competed at the international level since 2016. Hegge competes in the K1 class and in Extreme slalom. He lives and trains in Augsburg, home of the Eiskanal.

Hegge began paddling with Kanu Schwaben Augsburg in 2007, following his older brothers into the sport.

Hegge won a gold medal in the K1 team event at the 2022 ICF Canoe Slalom World Championships in Augsburg. He also won a bronze medal in the K1 team event at the 2022 European Championships in Liptovský Mikuláš.

He has won three medals in the K1 team event at the Junior and U23 World Championships, with a gold in 2017, a silver in 2016 (both junior), and a bronze in 2021 (U23). Hegge is also a two-time European Champion in K1 team, winning gold at both the 2020 U23 European Championships in Kraków and 2016 Junior European Championships in Solkan. He finished 11th in the overall World Cup standings in 2021. Hegge earned his best senior World Championship result of 6th at the 2021 event, where Germany fielded all three athletes in the final for the first time since 1995.

Results

Complete World Cup results

Complete Championship results

References

External links

1999 births
Living people
German male canoeists
Sportspeople from Augsburg
Medalists at the ICF Canoe Slalom World Championships